Ana de nadie is a Colombian telenovela produced by RCN Televisión. It premiered on 1 March 2023. The series is an adaptation of the 1993 telenovela Señora Isabel, which most recent popular version was Si nos dejan. It stars Paola Turbay, Sebastián Carvajal, and Jorge Enrique Abello.

Plot 
Ana Ocampo (Paola Turbay) is a 50-year-old woman who will have to face a divorce, after she discovers that her husband, Horacio (Jorge Enrique Abello), is unfaithful with a much younger woman, Adelaida Gómez (Laura Archbold). In the midst of her loneliness, Ana discovers that the end of her marriage will become a second chance for her as she enjoys her new life and becomes a stronger woman. She ends up meeting Joaquín Cortés (Sebastián Carvajal), who, after meeting Ana, assures her that she is the woman of his life. Meanwhile, Horacio realizes that ending his relationship with Ana was a mistake.

Cast 
 Paola Turbay as Ana Ocampo
 Sebastián Carvajal as Joaquín Cortés
 Jorge Enrique Abello as Horacio Valenzuela
 Laura Archbold as Adelaida Gómez
 Judy Henríquez as Dolores Viuda de Ocampo
 Ramistelly Herrera as Emma Valenzuela
 Carlos Báez as Pedro Valenzuela
 Ilenia Antonini as Florencia Valenzuela
 Adriana Romero as Genoveva Serrano
 Adriana Arango as Violeta Dávila
 Lucho Velasco as Benjamín Lemus
 Andrés Toro as Luciano Ucross
 Diana Wiswell as Oriana Castro
 Camila Zárate as Magdalena Zea
 Samuel Montalvo as Teo Cortés
 Carmen Rosa Franco as Úrsula Rojas
 Laura Hernández as Ximena Rojas

Recurring and guest stars 
 Ana María Pérez
 Ariana Diaz
 Mónica Botero
 Felipe Barbetti
 Eddy Lozada
 Carlos Quintero
 Óscar Javier Cuesta
 Felipe Fetecua
 Víctor Hugo Morant
 Eduardo López

Production 
Filming of the telenovela began on 9 November 2022. The first teaser of the series was shown on 8 February 2023.

Ratings

Episodes

References

External links 
 

2023 telenovelas
2023 Colombian television series debuts
Colombian telenovelas
RCN Televisión telenovelas
Spanish-language telenovelas